Stathelle is a town in Norway in the municipality of Bamble in the county of Telemark, Norway.

History
Stathelle was a former municipality in Telemark. It was separated from Bamble as a municipality of its own in 1851. In 1964, the municipalities of Stathelle and Langesund merged with Bamble municipality. With a population of about 8000, Stathelle is situated at the junction of the Langesundsfjord, Frierfjord and Eidangerfjord.

Stathelle is an old trading town. In the middle of the 1800s,  Stathelle was an enterprising seaport, characterized by the trading house established by Albert Blehr on Kjellestad,  which was one of the nation's largest timber exporters. Today there is a marina and a park in the same area.

Brevik bridge was constructed during 1962. Previously travelers along the southern highway  between Oslo and Stavanger had to take the ferry between the towns of Brevik and Stathelle.

Hansen & Arntzen Co AS is a traditional shipyard in Stathelle that specializes in the restoration of vessels. Hansen & Arntzen AS Ekstrand Co. was established in 1929 as a family business. The company is known  for its significant repair and restoration projects. Many famous ships have been restored there, including the Norwegian Royal Yacht HNoMY Norge.

The name
The first element could be the Old Norse word staðr m 'place; town', the last element is hella f 'flagstone, slab of rock'.

Notable residents 
Knud Karl Krogh-Tonning (1842–1911), Norwegian theologian, was born in Stathelle
Turid Thomassen (born 1965), politician
Ella Gjømle Berg (born 1979), cross country skier

See also
Stathel and staddle stones

References

External links
Hansen & Arntzen Co AS website

 
Former municipalities of Norway
Cities and towns in Norway
Populated places in Vestfold og Telemark
Bamble